Alice Florence Clarissa Merton (born 13 September 1993) is a German-Canadian singer and songwriter. Merton achieved mainstream success with her debut single, "No Roots". In 2017, she released her first EP  of the same name and in 2018, she released her debut album Mint and in 2022, her second album,S.I.D.E.S. was released.

Early life 
Merton was born on 13 September 1993 in Frankfurt, Germany to a German mother and an Irish-born father. Merton's family moved frequently due to her father's job as a mining consultant.  When she was three months old, Merton moved to Connecticut. Shortly thereafter, they relocated to Oakville, Ontario, Canada where she was raised until the age of thirteen, learning classical piano and singing. Her family then relocated to Munich. Merton's return to Germany prompted her to learn German which enabled her to speak with her German grandmother whom she had only seen annually growing up. While in Germany, Merton wrote her first song and attended a German-language high school before graduating and moving to England.

Merton moved frequently in her early life, living in Oakville, Ontario, Connecticut, New York, Munich, Bournemouth, London, and Berlin, among other cities. Through her upbringing, Merton has stated she has felt connected to Canada, England, Germany, and France where her mother lived. In 2013, she started her studies at the Popakademie Baden-Württemberg in Mannheim, where she earned a bachelor's degree in composition and song writing, and met the members of her future band.

Career

2015–2017: The Book of Nature, No Roots, and mainstream success
Merton first drew major attention in 2015 as a songwriter and singer on Fahrenhaidt's album The Book of Nature. On 14 November 2016 while in Hamburg, she won the annual award for the promotion of talented newcomers in the category Acoustic Pop.

After moving to Berlin, Merton and her manager Paul Grauwinkel founded the record label Paper Plane Records International, and released the song "No Roots" at the end of 2016. The song's lyrics were inspired by her feeling of "There's no one place where my home is." On both Hype Machine and Spotify's Global Viral 50 charts the song reached number one, and was soon included on the "Hit Play" lists of several radio stations. The song was also featured on episode 5x09 of the NBC TV series, The Blacklist.

On the basis of this success, Merton officially released her first EP, No Roots, on 3 February 2017. No Roots reached number one on the French charts, number two on the German charts, number three in Austria, number 25 in Switzerland and number one in US alternative radio charts. Vodafone Germany even included the song in one of its commercials. Merton signed with Mom + Pop Music in August 2017 for marketing within the United States,  and on 2 August 2017 she released her second single Hit the Ground Running with her new record label.

She performed at the Life Ball in Vienna on 10 June 2017, and ended the year touring throughout Germany, appearing as opening act for Bosse and Philipp Poisel, among others. In late 2017 she won the 2018 European Border Breakers Award.

2018–2020: Mint
On 7 September 2018, Merton released "Why So Serious", the lead single from her debut album, Mint. She released two other singles since then. The album was released on 18 January 2019. The second official single "Funny Business" was released 30 November. The video for the single was premiered 9 January. Also, this day she released her brand new song from album "Homesick".

Merton dueted with British singer-songwriter Tom Odell in the single "Half As Good As You" that was released on 28 September 2018.

On 1 February 2019, Merton released the first part of the Making of Mint documentary and announced an April 2019 USA concert tour.

In 2019, Merton was a coach on ninth series of The Voice of Germany, and became the first female coach to win a series with Claudia Emmanuela Santoso.

On 18 October 2019, Merton released her album Mint again with four additional songs (Back To Berlin, PCH, Easy and Keeps Me Awake). Later, in the beginning of 2020, she toured across Germany, Austria, Czech Republic and Denmark singing these new songs, as well as the ones from her previous album.

2021–present: S.I.D.E.S
On 8 April 2021, Merton released "Vertigo". On 9 September, she released "Hero" and "Island", both of which are from her upcoming second studio album, S.I.D.E.S., which she revealed the name 
on 23 February 2022, along with its tracklist. Her new work will count with 15 tracks, of which 6 have already been released. On TikTok she released a video announcing the release of the next song “Same Team” would be on 4 March 2022. Later in April 2022, she released her next single "Blindside", and lastly "Love Back" in May 2022.

She is touring with the British band Bastille in their "Give me the Future" American tour. Later in 2022, she performed in 7 different countries through all Europe, in her second album S.I.D.E.S tour. 

On 17 June, S.I.D.E.S. was released.

Personal life 
Merton currently resides in London.

Discography

Albums

Extended plays

Singles

Guest appearances

Notes

References

External links

 
 

1993 births
Living people
Singers from London
People from Connecticut
Canadian women pop singers
English women pop singers
Canadian people of Irish descent
Canadian people of German descent
English people of Irish descent
English people of German descent
21st-century Canadian women singers
21st-century English women singers
21st-century English singers
Mom + Pop Music artists